Yoo-hoo, Ladybird! is a 2013 children's picture book by Mem Fox and illustrated by Laura Ljungkvist. In this book, the reader is invited to find a ladybird amongst a jumble of toys and everyday items. The game of hide-and-seek continues throughout the book with different scenarios.

Publication history
 Yoo-hoo, Ladybug!, 2013, USA, Beach Lane Books 
 Yoo-hoo, Ladybird!, 2013, Australia, Penguin/Viking

Reception
A Publishers Weekly review of Yoo-hoo, Ladybird! wrote: "Effervescent graphics and an engrossing hide-and-seek game make this a diverting book to share".

Yoo-hoo, Ladybird! has also been reviewed by Kirkus Reviews, Booklist School Library Journal, and The Horn Book Magazine.

See also
 Where's Wally?

References

External links

 Library holdings of Yoo-hoo, Ladybird!

Australian picture books
2013 children's books
Picture books by Mem Fox
Puzzle books